The 2022 season was the New York Giants' 98th in the National Football League (NFL), their 47th season playing in The Meadowlands and their 13th playing at MetLife Stadium.

Following the conclusion of the 2021 season, head coach Joe Judge was fired and general manager Dave Gettleman retired. In the offseason, the Giants hired Bills front office assistant Joe Schoen to become their general manager, who in turn hired Bills offensive coordinator Brian Daboll to become the 22nd head coach in franchise history.

The Giants started 2–0 for the first time since 2016 and had their best start since 2008. The Giants surpassed their 2021 win total after a Week 6 win over the Baltimore Ravens. With a win over the Washington Commanders in Week 15, they guaranteed their first non-losing season since 2016, and their first season since 2009 in which they never had a losing record at any stage. The Giants clinched a playoff spot and a winning record for the first time since 2016 with a Week 17 win over the Indianapolis Colts and finished 9–7–1.

As the sixth seed in the NFC, the Giants beat the Minnesota Vikings 31–24 in the Wild Card round, getting their first playoff win since Super Bowl XLVI in 2012. However, the Giants' season would end the following week with a 38–7 loss to their arch-rival and eventual NFC champion Philadelphia Eagles in the Divisional Round.

Offseason

Office and coaching changes

General manager
Fourth-year general manager Dave Gettleman retired from the New York Giants on January 10, 2022. Gettleman drafted Saquon Barkley and Daniel Jones, among others. On January 21, 2022, the Giants hired Joe Schoen, the former assistant general manager for the Buffalo Bills, as their general manager.

Head coach
The New York Giants fired second-year head coach Joe Judge on January 11, 2022, who led the Giants to a 2nd-place finish in the NFC East after his first season as head coach. On January 28, 2022, Brian Daboll, the former offensive coordinator for the Buffalo Bills, was hired as head coach.

Coaching staff changes

Free agency

Players with the New York Giants in 2021

Source:

Players with other teams in 2021

Source:

Roster moves

Contracts

Source:

Departures

Source:

Signings

Source:

Draft

Draft trades

Staff

Final roster

Preseason

Regular season

Schedule
On May 4, the NFL announced that the Giants played the Green Bay Packers during Week 5 on October 9 at Tottenham Hotspur Stadium in London, as part of the league's International Series. The game kickoff at 2:30 p.m. BST/9:30 a.m. EDT, and was televised by the NFL Network, with the Packers serving as the home team.

The remainder of the Giants' 2022 schedule was announced on May 12.

Notes
 Intra-division opponents are in bold text.

Game summaries

Week 1: at Tennessee Titans

The Giants were timid in the first half, struggling to move the ball while the Titans did so with ease. Despite trailing 13–0 at halftime, the Giants had two big plays to bring them back in the game. Saquon Barkley provided the first spark with a 68-yard carry and capping the drive off with a 5-yard touchdown run. On the next drive, Daniel Jones connected with Sterling Shepard on a 65-yard touchdown pass to tie the game. The Titans responded with a touchdown drive of their own, when Ryan Tannehill connected with RB Dontrell Hilliard for his 2nd touchdown reception of the game, taking a 20–13 lead into the final quarter.

The Titans muffed a punt which the Giants recovered in the red zone, but Jones threw an end zone interception. On a Titans 3rd and 1, the Giants sniffed out a TE sweep to get the ball back. Barkley had a 33-yard run to move the ball into Titans territory, then Jones converted a 4th & 1 on a QB keep. A few plays later, Jones threw a 1-yard touchdown pass to FB Chris Myarick. The Giants opted to go for the two-point conversion instead of the tie, and Jones shoveled it to Barkley, who made two defenders miss and crossed the plane, giving the Giants a 21–20 lead with 1:06 to play. The Titans got the ball back with 1 timeout left and benefitted from two 3rd down defensive holding penalties to extend their drive into Giants territory. Tannehill hit WR Kyle Philips to put the Titans in field goal range and spiked the ball with four seconds left, but Randy Bullock missed the 47-yard kick. The Giants won 21–20 and shocked the Titans.

The Giants had a winning record for the first time since the end of the 2016 season, which was also the last year they won their season opener. Brian Daboll won his first game as NFL head coach in his debut. Barkley finished with 194 scrimmage yards, 164 on the ground, a touchdown and a 2-point conversion and was selected as the NFC Offensive Player of the Week for his performance.

Week 2: vs. Carolina Panthers

The Giants offense failed to capitalize on two early Panthers fumbles and settled for two field goals, which the Panthers matched in the second quarter. D.J. Moore scored a touchdown for Carolina to start the third quarter, and the Giants responded on their next drive when Daniel Jones hit rookie TE Daniel Bellinger for his first NFL touchdown to tie the game. After exchanging another set of field goals, the Giants took a 19–16 lead late in the fourth quarter when Graham Gano hit a 56-yard field goal, his fourth of the game against his former team. Julian Love sacked Baker Mayfield on the following Panthers drive to force a punt, then Jones converted on 3rd down and ran out the clock.

The Giants won their home opener and started 2–0 for the first time since 2016. Gano was selected as the NFC Special Teams Player of the Week for his performance.

Week 3: vs. Dallas Cowboys

The Giants scored their first two drives of the third quarter, the second a 36-yard touchdown run by Saquon Barkley to give the Giants their first lead of the game. The Cowboys responded with touchdowns on their next two drives to take a 20–13 lead - a rushing TD by Ezekiel Elliott and then a one-handed catch by CeeDee Lamb. The Cowboys forced a three-and-out started their next possession in field goal range, which they kicked to make it a two-score game. The Giants had a chance to tie the game after kicking a field goal of their own, but Daniel Jones, under duress all night, threw an interception to Trevon Diggs to end the game.

Jones fell to 0–9 in primetime games and was sacked five times, including three by DeMarcus Lawrence. Kayvon Thibodeaux recorded a pass deflection in his NFL debut, and Sterling Shepard suffered a season-ending ACL tear on the last play of the game.

Week 4: vs. Chicago Bears

Daniel Jones had 2 touchdowns in the first half from designed bootleg runs, the latter set up by an Azeez Ojulari strip-sack. The Bears were 0–3 in red zone drives and only mustered 4 field goals by Michael Badgley. Saquon Barkley had 146 of 262 rushing yards for the Giants and the defense registered 6 sacks. Both Jones and backup QB Tyrod Taylor were injured, putting the starter for the next game in London against the Packers in doubt.

The Giants started 3–1 for the first time since 2011.

Week 5: at Green Bay Packers
NFL London games

The Giants made their third trip to London after winning their first two at Wembley in 2007 and at Twickenham in 2016, while the Packers made their first trip after being the only NFL team that had never played outside of America. In the 15 years and 31 games in London played up to this point, this was the first game where both teams had winning records.

The Packers started the game in control and took a 17–3 lead after Aaron Rodgers threw his second touchdown pass to Marcedes Lewis in the middle of the second quarter. Daniel Jones (who was cleared to start despite his ankle injury) led the Giants on a touchdown drive which Daniel Bellinger scored on a trick play. The Packers kicked a field goal as the clock expired to take a 20–10 halftime lead.

The Giants kicked a field goal to open the second half to make it a one score game. Dexter Lawrence had a huge 3rd down sack to end the Packers next drive and put them out of field goal range. Despite temporarily losing Saquon Barkley, the Giants tied the game on the next drive when Gary Brightwell scored his first NFL touchdown. After forcing a three-and-out, the Giants scored on their fifth consecutive drive and took the lead when Barkley scored his first touchdown of the game. The Packers methodically drove into field goal range and inside the red zone, but the Giants forced two pass deflections and a turnover on downs. After three kneels, punter Jamie Gillan intentionally ran out the side of the end zone to give the Packers a safety, but a lack of field position to get a Hail Mary. Rodgers had one last chance for Green Bay, but was strip-sacked by Oshane Ximines and the Giants won 27–22.

The Giants matched their win total from 2021 in Week 5 and had their best start since 2009. Brian Daboll became the first head coach to start his Giants tenure 4–1 since Tom Coughlin in 2004.

Week 6: vs. Baltimore Ravens

The Ravens started with the ball and took all four of their first half drives into Giants territory, but scored for the first time on their third drive when Kenyan Drake had a 30-yard touchdown run and added a field goal before halftime. The Giants had trouble moving the ball but scored on their third drive when Wan'Dale Robinson caught his first career touchdown pass from Daniel Jones. The Ravens led 10–7 at halftime but outgained the Giants 256 yards to 90. The teams traded field goals in the 3rd quarter and Mark Andrews scored his first touchdown on a controversial play where Brian Daboll unsuccessfully pleaded for a delay of game. The Giants responded when Daniel Bellinger scored his first touchdown of the game with six minutes to play, and the Ravens got the ball back with a 20–17 lead.

The Ravens converted on a 3rd & 1 that had to be replayed because of an illegal formation penalty. On the ensuing play, the snap went behind Lamar Jackson who had to get the ball. Under duress, he threw an interception to Julian Love, the Giants first of the season, and Love returned the ball to the Ravens 13-yard line. On 3rd & 5, Jones threw an interception to Marcus Peters, but the referees penalized Peters for pass interference. Saquon Barkley scored the next play and the Giants led 24–20. Needing a stop to win, Kayvon Thibodeaux strip-sacked Jackson on the second play of the drive, his first in the NFL, and the Giants recovered. Jones and Barkley ran out the clock to secure the win in front of a rocking MetLife Stadium crowd.

Lamar Jackson lost to an NFC team for the first time in his career. The Giants won their third game of the season after trailing by double digits and exceeded their win total from 2021 in Week 6. Daboll became the first Giants coach to start his career 5–1 since Dan Reeves in 1993.

Week 7: at Jacksonville Jaguars

The Giants were trailing 11–10 in the second quarter after losing two offensive linemen. Jacksonville was driving and looking to take control of the game, but Travis Etienne, who scored his first career touchdown in the first quarter, fumbled the ball after being hit by Xavier McKinney on the 5-yard line and the Giants recovered. After taking the lead with a field goal before halftime, the Jaguars responded to the Giants by scoring a touchdown on their first drive of the second half to take a 17–13 lead. The Giants drove the ball in goal-to-go territory but were stopped by the Jaguars defense on 4th down. In the 4th quarter, Trevor Lawrence was driving the Jaguars into field goal range, but he too was stopped on 4th down. Daniel Jones responded with a 10-play, 79-yard drive which he capped off with a QB sneak touchdown to give the Giants a 20–17 lead. The Giants got the ball back and tried to run the clock out, but Saquon Barkley was ruled out of bounds upon video review following a critical 3rd down play. The Giants kicked a field goal to take a 23–17 lead, but gave the ball back to the Jaguars with 1:04 to play. Lawrence converted on a 4th down for the Jaguars and was aided by a roughing the passer penalty by his former Clemson teammate Dexter Lawrence, putting them in the red zone. Two plays later with 0:07 to play, Lawrence completed a pass to Christian Kirk on the 1-yard line, who was immediately hit by Fabian Moreau. Kirk tried to battle for the goal line, but a swarm of Giants collapsed on him and made the tackle as the clock expired, and the Giants won 23–17.

Daniel Jones orchestrated his fifth game-winning drive of the season and had a career high 107 rushing yards, the first by a Giants quarterback since 1946. He was selected as the NFC Offensive Player of the Week for his performance. The Giants 6–1 start was their best since 2008 and Brian Daboll's 6–1 record was the best start by a Giants head coach since LeRoy Andrews in 1929.

Week 8: at Seattle Seahawks

The Giants went 3-and-out on their first 3 possessions then Saquon Barkley scored a touchdown on a drive set up by Adoree' Jackson stripping Tyler Lockett at the Seahawks 2-yard line. Richie James returned the favor and fumbled a punt return, which the Seahawks cashed in with a field goal and a 10–7 halftime lead. On the Seahawks opening drive of the second half, Lockett dropped a wide open touchdown and the Seahawks settled for another field goal, which the Giants again responded to, tying the game 13-13. Lockett didn't miss his next opportunity in the 4th quarter when Geno Smith found him for the touchdown to give the Seahawks a 20–13 lead. Later, James fumbled a second punt return, and then Kenneth Walker III delivered the knockout blow. The Giants lost 27–13 heading into their bye week and fell to 3rd place in the division after being the only NFC East team to lose in Week 8.

Week 10: vs. Houston Texans

TE Lawrence Cager came off the practice squad and scored his first career touchdown on the Giants opening drive. The Giants were offensively in control but penalties and dropped passes stopped them from scoring again in the half. The Texans only had 86 yards in the first half, but 44 of them came on a run play by Dameon Pierce which set up a field goal and 7–3 halftime score.

Both offenses found their grooves in the third quarter. First, Texans rookie safety Jalen Pitre missed a tackle on Darius Slayton, who ran to the end zone for a Giants 54-yard touchdown. Nico Collins then caught a 12-yard touchdown pass to cut the Texans deficit to 4, then Saquon Barkley scored on the Giants next drive. The Texans drove into goal-to-go territory as the quarter drew to a close, but the Giants defense had two red zone takeaways in the fourth. Leonard Williams forced a fumble on the 2nd play, then rookie Dane Belton had his first career interception to stop the Texans next scoring threat. The teams only combined to score a series of field goals which was enough for the Giants to hold on for the win.

The Giants won 24–16 to improve to 7–2 with every win coming by one possession. Their seven wins were the most since 2016. Saquon Barkley finished with 152 rushing yards, and Daniel Jones had a 153.3 passer rating, a new career high. The Giants moved back into second place in the NFC East after the Cowboys lost later that day.

Week 11: vs. Detroit Lions

The Lions won the coin toss and deferred. With the Giants leading 6–3 in the 2nd quarter, Daniel Jones threw a pass which #2 overall pick Aidan Hutchinson intercepted and set up a Jamaal Williams touchdown run for the Lions. The Lions capitalized on two more touchdown drives, both scored by Williams, on both sides of the half to extend their lead to 24–6 early in the 3rd quarter. The Giants tried to battle back into the game, but another Jones interception in the 3rd quarter and Isaiah Hodgins catch and fumble in the 4th quarter ruined any chances for the Giants to make a comeback.

Jamaal Williams had 3 of 4 Lions rushing touchdowns, taking the NFL lead with his 12th of the season. The Giants lost 6 players to injury and fell back to 3rd place in the NFC East after the Cowboys beat the Vikings later that day.

Week 12: at Dallas Cowboys
Thanksgiving Day games

The Giants only scored 3 points from two Dallas turnovers on their first two drives - the latter turnover being the first career interception for Rodarius Williams - after a touchdown was called off by a penalty. Trailing 7–3, Saquon Barkley scored the Giants first offensive touchdown on Thanksgiving Day since 1938 and took a 13–7 halftime lead into the locker room. Dallas stormed back in the third quarter when Dalton Schultz caught two touchdown passes from Dak Prescott and the Giants failed to convert on a 4th and 1. The Cowboys put the game away with a touchdown run by backup TE Peyton Hendershot. Richie James scored a late touchdown to make the final score 28–20 Cowboys.

The Cowboys won their first Thanksgiving Day game since 2018 and won 16 of the last 20 meetings against the Giants dating back to 2013. The Giants lost consecutive games for the first time in 2022 and their fourth consecutive Thanksgiving Day game dating back to 1992.

Week 13: vs. Washington Commanders

Daniel Jones had a fumble on the opening drive which Joey Slye converted with a field goal, then Terry McLaurin scored on the next Commanders drive to take an early 10–0 lead. The Giants responded with 10 points on their next two drives to tie the game, then the teams traded a pair of field goals to tie 13–13 at halftime. Azeez Ojulari, in his first game back from injury, strip-sacked Taylor Heinicke  and recovered the ball setting the Giants up in the red zone to begin the 3rd quarter. Jones converted with a touchdown pass to Isaiah Hodgins, the first in his career. Late in the 4th quarter, Darius Slayton made a first down catch and putting the Giants closer to field goal range to put the game out of reach, but the play was nullified by a taunting penalty by center Jon Feliciano and the drive stalled. On the next Commanders drive, Heinicke evaded a sack and converted on a 4th & 4 which led to a game-tying touchdown by Jahan Dotson. The game then reverted to a defensive stalemate with both teams exchanging punts in the final 1:45 of the 4th quarter and two punts each during overtime. The Giants ended with the ball and got in position to attempt a game-winning 58-yard field goal with 5 seconds left, but Graham Gano's kick fell short.

The Giants tied for the first time since 1997, which was also against Washington. This was their first tie game at home since their final game at Yankee Stadium in 1973, which was the year before the NFL added overtime.

Week 14: vs. Philadelphia Eagles

The Eagles scored touchdowns on their opening three drives - the second a 41-yard catch by DeVonta Smith on a 4th & 7 - and the Giants failed to match that output all game. They fell to 7–5–1 but held on to the 7th seed when the Seahawks lost to the Panthers later that day.

Week 15: at Washington Commanders

The NFL flexed this game into primetime after the Week 13 tie. Kayvon Thibodeaux was dominant in the first half with 3 TFL in the first quarter, and then a strip-sack, recovery, and touchdown all on the same play early in the second quarter. Later in the quarter, Daniel Jones led the Giants on an 18-play, 97-yard, 8-minute drive which included key 3rd & 9 and 4th & 9 conversions to Richie James. Saquon Barkley cashed in with a 3-yard run to end the drive and give the Giants a 14–3 halftime lead. Taylor Heinicke connected with Jahan Dotson on the Commanders opening drive of the 3rd quarter to make the score 14–9. Heinicke again connected with Dotson in the 4th quarter on a 61-yard pass play to put the Commanders in prime scoring territory, but was sacked by Dexter Lawrence. The replay showed the ball was coming out before Heinicke touched the ground, and Brian Daboll successfully challenged the call. Jones and Barkley primarily ran the ball into field goal range and Graham Gano converted his second 50-yard field goal of the half to give the Giants a 20–12 lead with 1:55 to play. Like two weeks prior, Heinicke again drove the Commanders into the red zone with the game on the line. On 2nd & Goal, Heinicke flushed the pocket and rolled right to run to the pylon but was stopped by Thibodeaux, who originally dropped back into coverage, on the 1-yard line. Brian Robinson had a touchdown on 3rd & Goal, but Terry McLaurin - who twice checked with the line judge to make sure he was set - was penalized for illegal formation and replayed down resulted in an incomplete pass. On 4th & Goal, Heinicke threw a pass to Curtis Samuel which was batted down by Darnay Holmes, giving the Giants the ball back and the victory. Holmes appeared to be holding Samuel, but a penalty wasn't called.

The Giants snapped their 4 game winless streak and improved to 8–5–1, winning their first primetime game in four years, and put themselves in prime position to clinch a playoff spot with three games to play. The win also ensured the Giants would not have a losing record for the first time since 2016, and defeated Washington for the 105th time - the most wins versus a single opponent in NFL history. Kayvon Thibodeaux finished with 12 tackles, 3 TFL, 1 sack, 1 forced fumble, 1 fumble recovery, and 1 touchdown, and was named the NFC Defensive Player of the Week for his performance.

Week 16: at Minnesota Vikings

The Vikings won the preview of the playoff game played three weeks later. T. J. Hockenson, who would have big games in both matchups, struck first with a late 1st quarter touchdown. The Giants were driving but Vikings LB Brian Asamoah stripped Daniel Bellinger and the Vikings cashed in with a field goal. The Giants offense responded when Isaiah Hodgins capped off a touchdown drive and the Vikings led 10–7 at halftime. Graham Gano converted two 44-yard field goals for the Giants in the third quarter and the Giants led 13–10 going into the fourth.

Hockenson scored his second touchdown of the day to start the quarter. The Giants drive stalled when Richie James dropped a third down pass, but Gano converted a 55-yard field goal, his third of the game. After exchanging drives, Jamie Gillan's punt was blocked and the Vikings recovered in scoring range. Kirk Cousins threw his third touchdown pass of the game to Justin Jefferson with 3:00 remaining. The Vikings opted to kick the extra point and led 24–16. The Giants scored 59 seconds later when Saquon Barkley had a 27-yard run on 4th & 2. They tied the game when Daniel Jones hit Bellinger for the two-point conversion. The Vikings methodically drove down the field with two third down conversions, and kicker Greg Joseph hit a franchise record 61-yard field goal as time expired. The Vikings won 27–24 and Kirk Cousins tied Matthew Stafford's NFL record with his 8th game-winning drive of the season. The Giants lost on a 60+ yard game-winning field goal as time expired for the third time in six seasons. The Giants fell 8–3–1 in one-score games while the Vikings improved to an NFL-record 11–0 on the season in one-score games. Despite falling to 8–6–1 overall, the Giants maintained pole position in the NFC wild card race when the Commanders, Seahawks and Lions also lost.

Week 17: vs. Indianapolis Colts

The Giants clinched the #6 seed in the NFC, their first playoff berth since 2016, in a 38-10 win over the Colts. Their 28-point win was the Giants largest in ten years, and the offense scored 30 points for the first time in 50 games. Brian Daboll became the sixth Giants head coach to clinch a playoff berth in his first season with the team and the first since Ben McAdoo in 2016.

The Giants erupted with 24 points in the second quarter; Daniel Jones had two passing touchdowns then Landon Collins returned an interception for a touchdown. Jones added two more touchdowns with his legs in the second half, and it was the first game since his NFL debut that he finished with two passing and two rushing touchdowns.

Week 18: at Philadelphia Eagles

The Giants rested their starters having already secured the #6 seed in the NFC playoffs and third string QB Davis Webb made his first career NFL start. The Eagles jumped to a 19-0 lead in the third quarter and hung on to win 22-16, therefore winning the NFC East and securing the #1 seed and first-round bye.

In the first quarter, Boston Scott had his 17th career touchdown - including his 10th against the Giants - and A. J. Brown set the Eagles franchise receiving record.

In the fourth quarter, Davis Webb scored his first career NFL touchdown, a 14-yard run. He threw his first career touchdown pass to Kenny Golladay - his first touchdown reception as a Giant - in the closing minutes of the game.

Because the Giants beat the Vikings the next week in the Wild Card round, this game was ultimately a playoff preview of the Divisional Round matchup to be played between the teams 13 days later.

Standings

Division

Conference

Postseason

Schedule

Game summaries

NFC Wild Card Playoffs: at (3) Minnesota Vikings

NFC Divisional Playoffs: at (1) Philadelphia Eagles

Awards and honors

References

External links
 

New York Giants
New York Giants seasons
New York Giants
21st century in East Rutherford, New Jersey
Meadowlands Sports Complex